Conasprella berwerthi is an extinct species of sea snail, a marine gastropod mollusk in the family Conidae, the cone snails and their allies.

Distribution
Fossils of this marine species were found in Austria.

References

External links
 Harzhauser M. & Landau B. (2016). A revision of the Neogene Conidae and Conorbidae (Gastropoda) of the Paratethys Sea. Zootaxa. 4210(1): 1-178

berwerthi
 Gastropods described in 1879